James Loyd Mayberry (born November 5, 1957) is a former American football running back in the National Football League who played for the Atlanta Falcons. He played college football for the Colorado Buffaloes. He also played in the USFL for the Washington Federals.

In Mayberry's first professional football game, the Falcons faced the rival New Orleans Saints in the Louisiana Superdome. With the game tied 34-34 in sudden death overtime, Mayberry intercepted a hurried chest pass by Saints punter Russell Erxleben, who was forced to retrieve the ball at the goal line after a high snap by long snapper John Watson. Mayberry caught the ball in stride at the 6-yard line and waltzed untouched into the end zone to give the Falcons a 40-34 victory, Atlanta's third consecutive win over New Orleans in which the Falcons scored the game-winning touchdown in the final seconds of regulation or overtime. The loss ended up keeping the Saints from their first winning season, as they finished 8-8.

References

1957 births
Living people
American football running backs
Atlanta Falcons players
Washington Federals/Orlando Renegades players
Colorado Buffaloes football players